Lombardy elected its seventh delegation to the Italian Senate on June 20, 1976. This election was a part of national Italian general election of 1976 even if, according to the Italian Constitution, every senatorial challenge in each Region is a single and independent race.

Lombardy obtained three more seats to the Senate, following the redistricting subsequent to the 1971 Census.

The election was won by the centrist Christian Democracy, as it happened at national level. Seven Lombard provinces gave a majority or at least a plurality to the winning party, while the agricultural Province of Pavia and Province of Mantua preferred the Italian Communist Party.

Background
The Italian Communist Party, which had annexed the Italian Socialist Party of Proletarian Unity, strengthened under Enrico Berlinguer's leadership, reducing the gap with the Christian Democracy, which by its part obtained some votes from minor forces, as the Italian Liberal Party and the Italian Democratic Socialist Party, to face the red rising.

Electoral system
The electoral system for the Senate was a strange hybrid which established a form of proportional representation into FPTP-like constituencies. A candidate needed a landslide victory of more than 65% of votes to obtain a direct mandate. All constituencies where this result was not reached entered into an at-large calculation based upon the D'Hondt method to distribute the seats between the parties, and candidates with the best percentages of suffrages inside their party list were elected.

Results

|-
|- bgcolor="#E9E9E9"
!rowspan="1" align="left" valign="top"|Party
!rowspan="1" align="center" valign="top"|votes
!rowspan="1" align="center" valign="top"|votes (%)
!rowspan="1" align="center" valign="top"|seats
!rowspan="1" align="center" valign="top"|swing
|-
!align="left" valign="top"|Christian Democracy
|valign="top"|2,170,893
|valign="top"|41.8
|valign="top"|21
|valign="top"|1
|-
!align="left" valign="top"|Italian Communist Party
|valign="top"|1,598,097
|valign="top"|30.7
|valign="top"|16
|valign="top"|4
|-
!align="left" valign="top"|Italian Socialist Party
|valign="top"|613,253
|valign="top"|11.8
|valign="top"|6
|valign="top"|=
|-
!align="left" valign="top"|Italian Social Movement
|valign="top"|210,741
|valign="top"|4.1
|valign="top"|2
|valign="top"|=
|-
!align="left" valign="top"|Italian Republican Party
|valign="top"|185,899
|valign="top"|3.6
|valign="top"|1
|valign="top"|=
|-
!align="left" valign="top"|Italian Democratic Socialist Party
|valign="top"|183,383
|valign="top"|3.5
|valign="top"|1
|valign="top"|1
|-
!align="left" valign="top"|Italian Liberal Party
|valign="top"|109,028
|valign="top"|2.1
|valign="top"|1
|valign="top"|1
|-
!align="left" valign="top"|Others
|valign="top"|136,997
|valign="top"|2.4
|valign="top"|-
|valign="top"|=
|- bgcolor="#E9E9E9"
!rowspan="1" align="left" valign="top"|Total parties
!rowspan="1" align="right" valign="top"|5,198,291
!rowspan="1" align="right" valign="top"|100.0
!rowspan="1" align="right" valign="top"|48
!rowspan="1" align="right" valign="top"|3
|}

Sources: Italian Ministry of the Interior

Constituencies

|-
|- bgcolor="#E9E9E9"
!align="left" valign="top"|N°
!align="center" valign="top"|Constituency
!align="center" valign="top"|Elected
!align="center" valign="top"|Party
!align="center" valign="top"|Votes %
!align="center" valign="top"|Others
|-
|align="left"|1
|align="left"|Bergamo
|align="left"|Angelo Castelli
|align="left"|Christian Democracy
|align="left"|59.1%
|align="left"|
|-
|align="left"|2
|align="left"|Clusone
|align="left"|Leandro Rampa
|align="left"|Christian Democracy
|align="left"|63.8%
|align="left"|
|-
|align="left"|3
|align="left"|Treviglio
|align="left"|Vincenzo Bombardieri
|align="left"|Christian Democracy
|align="left"|57.3%
|align="left"|
|-
|align="left"|4
|align="left"|Brescia
|align="left"|Mino Martinazzoli
|align="left"|Christian Democracy
|align="left"|45.6%
|align="left"|
|-
|align="left"|5
|align="left"|Breno
|align="left"|Giacomo Mazzoli
|align="left"|Christian Democracy
|align="left"|55.3%
|align="left"|
|-
|align="left"|6
|align="left"|Chiari
|align="left"|Mario Pedini
|align="left"|Christian Democracy
|align="left"|57.3%
|align="left"|
|-
|align="left"|7
|align="left"|Salò
|align="left"|Fabiano De ZanEgidio Ariosto
|align="left"|Christian DemocracyItalian Democratic Socialist Party
|align="left"|48.3%5.8%
|align="left"|
|-
|align="left"|8
|align="left"|Como
|align="left"|Luigi Borghi
|align="left"|Christian Democracy
|align="left"|44.8%
|align="left"|
|-
|align="left"|9
|align="left"|Lecco
|align="left"|Tommaso Morlino
|align="left"|Christian Democracy
|align="left"|52.3%
|align="left"|
|-
|align="left"|10
|align="left"|Cantù
|align="left"|Siro Lombardini
|align="left"|Christian Democracy
|align="left"|49.6%
|align="left"|
|-
|align="left"|11
|align="left"|Cremona
|align="left"|Vincenzo VernaschiGiuseppe Garoli
|align="left"|Christian DemocracyItalian Communist Party
|align="left"|39.6%36.5%
|align="left"|
|-
|align="left"|12
|align="left"|Crema
|align="left"|Ferdinando TruzziGiacomo Carnesella
|align="left"|Christian DemocracyItalian Socialist Party
|align="left"|49.0%13.1%
|align="left"|Paolo Zanini (PCI) 28.4%
|-
|align="left"|13
|align="left"|Mantua
|align="left"|Carlo GrazioliTullia Romagnoli
|align="left"|Christian DemocracyItalian Communist Party (Gsi)
|align="left"|37.0%35.8%
|align="left"|
|-
|align="left"|14
|align="left"|Ostiglia
|align="left"|Agostino ZavattiniRenato Colombo
|align="left"|Italian Communist PartyItalian Socialist Party
|align="left"|42.6%14.8%
|align="left"|
|-
|align="left"|15
|align="left"|Milan 1
|align="left"|Luigi NoèEnzo Bettiza
|align="left"|Christian DemocracyItalian Liberal Party
|align="left"|37.1%9.3%
|align="left"|
|-
|align="left"|16
|align="left"|Milan 2
|align="left"|Gastone Nencioni
|align="left"|Italian Social Movement
|align="left"|9.0%
|align="left"|
|-
|align="left"|17
|align="left"|Milan 3
|align="left"|Vera SquarcialupiGiorgio Pisanò
|align="left"|Italian Communist PartyItalian Social Movement
|align="left"|28.9%7.4%
|align="left"|
|-
|align="left"|18
|align="left"|Milan 4
|align="left"|Urbano AlettiGiovanni Spadolini
|align="left"|Christian DemocracyItalian Republican Party
|align="left"|36.5%9.3%
|align="left"|
|-
|align="left"|19
|align="left"|Milan 5
|align="left"|Mario Venanzi
|align="left"|Italian Communist Party
|align="left"|34.5%
|align="left"|
|-
|align="left"|20
|align="left"|Milan 6
|align="left"|Lelio BassoCarlo Polli
|align="left"|Italian Communist Party (Gsi)Italian Socialist Party
|align="left"|36.9%13.8%
|align="left"|
|-
|align="left"|21
|align="left"|Abbiategrasso
|align="left"|Ada Valeria RuhlAgostino Viviani
|align="left"|Italian Communist PartyItalian Socialist Party
|align="left"|38.0%13.0%
|align="left"|
|-
|align="left"|22
|align="left"|Rho
|align="left"|Giorgio MilaniBruno Luzzati
|align="left"|Italian Communist PartyItalian Socialist Party
|align="left"|39.6%13.1%
|align="left"|
|-
|align="left"|23
|align="left"|Monza
|align="left"|Vittorino ColomboGeneroso Petrella
|align="left"|Christian DemocracyItalian Communist Party
|align="left"|41.0%32.7%
|align="left"|
|-
|align="left"|24
|align="left"|Vimercate
|align="left"|Giovanni MarcoraAngelo Romanò
|align="left"|Christian DemocracyItalian Communist Party (Gsi)
|align="left"|43.6%33.6%
|align="left"|
|-
|align="left"|25
|align="left"|Lodi
|align="left"|Camillo RipamontiRodolfo Bollini
|align="left"|Christian DemocracyItalian Communist Party
|align="left"|39.6%39.3%
|align="left"|
|-
|align="left"|26
|align="left"|Pavia
|align="left"|Renato Cebrelli
|align="left"|Italian Communist Party
|align="left"|39.5%
|align="left"|
|-
|align="left"|27
|align="left"|Voghera
|align="left"|Giovanni Bellinzona
|align="left"|Italian Communist Party
|align="left"|36.1%
|align="left"|
|-
|align="left"|28
|align="left"|Vigevano
|align="left"|Armando Cossutta
|align="left"|Italian Communist Party
|align="left"|45.3%
|align="left"|
|-
|align="left"|29
|align="left"|Sondrio
|align="left"|Eugenio TarabiniEdoardo Catellani
|align="left"|Christian DemocracyItalian Socialist Party
|align="left"|52.1%15.5%
|align="left"|
|-
|align="left"|30
|align="left"|Varese
|align="left"|Aristide MarchettiClaudio Donelli
|align="left"|Christian DemocracyItalian Communist Party
|align="left"|40.8%29.9%
|align="left"|
|-
|align="left"|31
|align="left"|Busto Arsizio 
|align="left"|'''Gian Pietro RossiModesto Merzario
|align="left"|Christian DemocracyItalian Communist Party
|align="left"|44.1%29.6%
|align="left"|
|}

No senator obtained a direct mandate. Please remember that the electoral system was, in the other cases, a form of proportional representation and not a FPTP race: so candidates winning with a simple plurality could have (and usually had) a candidate (usually a Christian democrat) with more votes in their constituency.

Substitutions
Paolo Zanini for Crema (28.4%) replaced Lelio Basso in 1978. Reason: death.

Notes

Elections in Lombardy
1976 elections in Italy